A fermentation starter (called simply starter within the corresponding context, sometimes called a mother) is a preparation to assist the beginning of the fermentation process in preparation of various foods and alcoholic drinks.  Food groups where they are used include breads, especially sourdough bread, and cheese.  A starter culture is a microbiological culture which actually performs fermentation. These starters usually consist of a cultivation medium, such as grains, seeds, or nutrient liquids that have been well colonized by the microorganisms used for the fermentation.

These starters are formed using a specific cultivation medium and a specific mix of fungal and bacterial strains.

Typical microorganisms used in starters include various bacteria and fungi (yeasts and molds):  Rhizopus, Aspergillus, Mucor,  Amylomyces, Endomycopsis, Saccharomyces, Hansenula anomala, Lactobacillus, Acetobacter, etc. Various national cultures have various active ingredients in starters, and often involve mixed microflora.

Industrial starters include various enzymes, in addition to microflora.

National names

In descriptions of national cuisines, fermentation starters may be referred to by their national names: 
Qū (simplified: 曲; traditional: 麴, also romanized as chu) (China)
Jiuqu: the starter used for making Chinese alcoholic beverages
Laomian: Chinese sourdough starter commonly used in Northern Chinese cuisine, the sourness of the starter is commonly quenched with sodium carbonate prior to use.
Mae dombae or mae sra  (Cambodia)
Meju (Korea)
Nuruk (Korea)
Koji (麹) (Japan)
Ragi tapai (Indonesia and Malaysia)
Bakhar, ranu, marchaar (murcha), Virjan (India)
Bubod, tapay, budbud (Philippines)
Loogpaeng, loog-pang, or look-pang  (Thailand)
Levain (France)
Bread zakvaska (закваска, sourdough) (Russia, Ukraine) or zakwas (Poland)
Opara (опара), a starter based on yeast (Russia)
Juuretis (Estonia)

See also
 Bread starter
 Leaven
 Malting
 Symbiotic culture of bacteria and yeast

References

Brewing
Fermentation in food processing